Sceliphrinae is a subfamily of thread-waisted wasps in the family Sphecidae. There are about 6 genera and at least 140 described species in Sceliphrinae.

Genera
These six genera belong to the subfamily Sceliphrinae:
 Chalybion Dahlbom, 1843 i c g b (blue mud wasps)
 Dynatus Lepeletier de Saint Fargeau, 1845 i c g
 Penepodium Menke in R. Bohart and Menke, 1976 i c g
 Podium Fabricius, 1804 i c g b
 Sceliphron Klug, 1801 i c g b
 Trigonopsis Perty, 1833 i c g
 †Hoplisidia Cockerell, 1906
 †Protosceliphron Antropov, 2014
Data sources: i = ITIS, c = Catalogue of Life, g = GBIF, b = Bugguide.net

References

Further reading

External links

 

Sphecidae